Reuben Seroney Kosgei (born 2 August 1979 in Kapcherop, Kenya), is a middle and long distance athlete mostly famous for 3000 m steeplechase in which he became the youngest ever winner of an Olympic gold medal in the event when at the age of 21 he ran to victory in Sydney 2000 with a winning time of 8 minutes 21.43 seconds.

At the 2006 Commonwealth Games he won a bronze medal in the steeplechase race.

He made his marathon debut at the 2009 Vienna Marathon, but did not finish the race. He finished 2nd at the 2009 Florence Marathon

A regular visitor to Australia, Kosgei won the 2009 Sydney Morning Herald Half Marathon in 64:18 and returned in 2010 to place 3rd in Perth's City to Surf Marathon.  He won the 2011 Perth City to Surf 12 km event, the 2011 Bridge to Brisbane fun run, the 2011 Adelaide City-Bay fun run and most recently, came second in the 2015 Adelaide City-Bay fun run. As of 2013, Kosgei intends on making Australia his home.

Major achievements
(all 3000 m steeplechase)
2000
2000 Summer Olympics – Sydney, Australia
gold medal
1998
1998 IAAF World Junior Championships – Annecy, France
gold medal
2001
2001 World Championships in Athletics – Edmonton, Canada
gold medal
Goodwill Games – Brisbane, Australia
silver medal

References

External links

1979 births
Living people
People from Nandi County
Kenyan male middle-distance runners
Kenyan male steeplechase runners
Kenyan male marathon runners
Kenyan male long-distance runners
Olympic male steeplechase runners
Olympic athletes of Kenya
Olympic gold medalists for Kenya
Olympic gold medalists in athletics (track and field)
Athletes (track and field) at the 2000 Summer Olympics
Medalists at the 2000 Summer Olympics
Commonwealth Games bronze medallists for Kenya
Commonwealth Games medallists in athletics
Athletes (track and field) at the 2006 Commonwealth Games
Goodwill Games medalists in athletics
World Athletics Championships athletes for Kenya
World Athletics Championships medalists
World Athletics Championships winners
Competitors at the 2001 Goodwill Games
Medallists at the 2006 Commonwealth Games